Lincoln College Boat Club is a rowing club for members of Lincoln College, Oxford. It is based on the Isis at Boathouse Island, Christ Church Meadow, Oxford, Oxford.

The club shares a boathouse with Oriel College Boat Club and The Queen's College Boat Club. The club competes in the Torpids and Summer Eights and the Henley Fours and Eights.

Honours; Henley Royal Regatta

See also
University rowing (UK)
Oxford University Boat Club
Rowing on the River Thames

References

Rowing clubs of the University of Oxford
Lincoln College, Oxford
Rowing clubs in Oxfordshire
Rowing clubs of the River Thames
Sport in Oxford
Rowing clubs in England